Conters is name of several localities in Switzerland:

Conters im Prättigau
Conters im Oberhalbstein, see Cunter, Switzerland